Eugene "Geno" Brenton Lewis (born April 20, 1993) is a Canadian football wide receiver for the Edmonton Elks of the Canadian Football League (CFL). He played college football for the Penn State Nittany Lions and Oklahoma Sooners.

High school career 
Lewis played four years of football at Wyoming Valley West. He joined Ron Powlus and Raghib Ismail as one of the most heavily recruited players from the Wyoming Valley Conference.

Lewis was recruited to play at Penn State by coach Joe Paterno, though he also had offers from Oregon and Virginia Tech, among other schools.

College career
Lewis played for the Penn State Nittany Lions from 2012 to 2015. He was redshirted in 2012. He transferred to play for the Oklahoma Sooners in 2016. He played in 51 games, starting 19, during his college career, catching 122 passes for 1,569 yards and 10 touchdowns.

Professional career
Lewis was rated the 71st best wide receiver in the 2017 NFL Draft by NFLDraftScout.com.

After going undrafted, Lewis attended rookie minicamp with the Cincinnati Bengals and Seattle Seahawks in May 2017.

Montreal Alouettes

Lewis signed with the Montreal Alouettes of the Canadian Football League (CFL) on June 12, 2017. His first season in the CFL was quiet, playing on only two games and catching seven passes. Lewis briefly restarted his basketball career in November 2017 with the NEPA Stars & Stripes franchise in the American Basketball Association. In the following two seasons in the CFL, Lewis became a starting wide receiver for the Alouettes, playing in all 36 regular season games and catching a combined 116 passes for 1,960 yards with nine touchdowns. Lewis was named a CFL East All-Star following the 2019 season. After the 2020 season was cancelled due to Covid-19 pandemic he re-signed with the Alouettes on December 16, 2020. Lewis had an outstanding season in 2021, catching 62 passes for 964 yards with nine touchdowns. His strong play was rewarded as he was named a CFL All-Star for the first time in his career. On December 16, 2021, Lewis and the Alouettes agreed to a contract extension through the 2022 CFL season. Lewis had an outstanding season with the Alouettes in 2022, playing in 17 regular season games and catching 91 passes for 1,303 yards with 10 touchdowns. He finished second in the league in receptions, and third in both receiving yards and touchdown receptions. He was named the East Division's Most Outstanding Player, earning the Terry Evanshen Trophy in the process. In late January 2023, as a pending free agent, Lewis took to social media to announce his intention to enter free agency in February.

Edmonton Elks
Lewis joined the Edmonton Elks as a free agent on February 14, 2023.

References

External links
Montreal Alouettes bio

1993 births
Living people
People from Norristown, Pennsylvania
Players of American football from Pennsylvania
Sportspeople from Montgomery County, Pennsylvania
American football wide receivers
Canadian football wide receivers
American players of Canadian football
Penn State Nittany Lions football players
Oklahoma Sooners football players
Montreal Alouettes players